JLA: Destiny is a four issue  comic book mini-series that was published by DC Comics in 2002, written by John Arcudi and drawn by Tom Mandrake.

The series was created as part of DC's Elseworlds line. This series was based on characters from the Justice League of America but featured them in a setting where Batman and Superman never existed.

Plot

Issue 1
The series opens with a flashback to the Human Bomb blowing up a hotel and killing the United States Cabinet officials who are meeting there.

This world's version of the Justice League was founded by Thomas Wayne after his wife and his son Bruce were killed in a robbery. The original members of the group were The Clock, Manhunter, Midnight, Mr. Scarlet, and Nightshade. They originally confined their activities to Gotham City and were highly effective in eliminating crime in that city. After the bombing described above, Wayne decided the League needed to expand across the nation and also needed to recruit superpowered members.

Three members of the group - the Clock, Manhunter, and Green Lantern (Guy Gardner) - disappeared on a mission a few years before and they are believed dead. Nightshade has left the group and is now known as Destiny. She has psychic powers but they appear to affect her mental stability - the League consults her for information but she does not actively participate.

The current version of the Justice League consists of:
Captain Thunder - an African-American version of Captain Marvel.
Flash - the Wally West version of the character.
Marksman - a version of the 1940s character of the same name from the 1940s Smash Comics series.
Midnight - another minor character from the 1940s Smash Comics series.
Triumph - resembles Superman and has similar powers.
The Unknown - a version of the 1940s character of that name, although his appearance is similar to the Spectre.
Widow - based on the obscure 1940s character Spider Widow.
Wonder Woman

Three of the characters - Marksman, Midnight, and Widow - have no superpowers and their usefulness is dismissed by the other members of the group.

The issue introduces Kamburu, a fictional nation that appears to be based on Iraq or Libya. Kamburu is harboring a mysterious figure known as Khouriga Edjem, who has been indicted by an international court. Edjem has been providing aid to Kamburu which has created surpluses of energy and food. Edjem has formed his own superpowered group:

Aqualord - a drug-addicted version of Aquaman who believes himself to be a servant of God.
Black Adam - an armored character.
Kondor - a winged character who is the leader of the group and is based on Black Condor.
Thane - a Nordic character who wields a giant axe and rides on a black horse. He has two trolls who serve him.
Wildfire - a character who can control fire. She shows no mercy except when it comes to children. She is based on obscure 1940s character Wildfire.

Edjem sends his team to attack a refinery. The Justice League ambushes them. In the resulting battle, Black Adam puts the Unknown into a coma and Aqualord is captured.

The issue also introduces this world's version of Lex Luthor, who runs a scientific institute in Switzerland dedicated to developing peaceful technology.

Issue 2
Midnight and Widow meet with Destiny. It's revealed that Midnight had been in love with her but she married Manhunter.

This issue explains Luthor's background. He had been an unscrupulous arms dealer but renounced his criminal ways after a disfiguring accident. Thomas Wayne now funds his institute.

Edjem sends his team to attack an American military base. The Justice League once again ambushes them. Marksman, Midnight, and Widow have been outfitted with armored suits. Flash, Triumph, and Wonder Woman are injured in the fight but Thane and Kondor are captured.

Edjem suspects Luthor provided the armored suits to the League and has the Human Bomb destroy Luthor's institute. It's revealed that Luthor also has superpowers.

Issue 3
Luthor believes Wayne stole the armored suit designs from him and blames him for the attack. He attacks and destroys Wayne's headquarters. The Justice League responds. Luthor appears to be capable of defeating their combined attack but then surrenders.

Destiny foresaw Luthor's attack and tried to warn Wayne but was unable to contact him in time. She then travels to the Nevada desert where she encounters a giant alien lying in the sand. The alien is J'onn J'onzz.

Interrogation of the captured members of his team (the Human Bomb was also captured after his attack on Luthor) reveal that Edjem has been working on causing a massive crop failure in the United States. United Nations troops, supported by the Justice League, surround Kamburu and issue an ultimatum calling for Edjem's surrender.

Luthor's true background is revealed. He is really Jor-El the last surviving Kryptonian. He knew Krypton was doomed and built a rocket to save his wife and son, Kal-El. But Krypton blew up while he was testing the rocket and he was the only survivor. He traveled to Earth where he began working for the real Lex Luthor. When his survival from the accident revealed his powers, he made a deal with Luthor, giving Luthor his ship so Luthor could leave Earth to conquer other worlds and with Jor-El assuming Luthor's identity.

Jor-El escapes and flies to Kamburu to confront Edjem and discovers Edjem now possesses his ship. Triumph follows him and is attacked by Black Adam. Triumph is able to defeat Black Adam and discovers he was an artificially intelligent robot. Edjem is enraged by Black Adam's destruction and kills Triumph.

Issue 4
Jor-El discovers that Khouriga Edjem is actually an interplanetary conqueror named Mongul. Lex Luthor had landed on one of the planets Mongul was trying to conquer and had organized its defense. Mongul was able to eventually capture the planet and kill Luthor but was impressed by Luthor's abilities. Mongul decided to use Jor-El's ship to travel back to Earth and conquer it.

J'onn J'onzz reveals to Destiny that the original Manhunter, Paul Kirk, had died years earlier and J'onzz had assumed his identity. It was actually J'onzz that Destiny had married. The mission on which he, the Clock and Green Lantern had disappeared was to investigate Mongul's ship after it arrived on Earth. Mongul captured Green Lantern, killed the Clock, and believed he had killed J'onzz. But J'onzz survived as a disembodied mind because of his psychic powers. Destiny's apparent psychic power was actually J'onzz sending messages to her telepathically.

Mongul used a parasitic plant called the Black Mercy to take control of Green Lantern's mind and has been using Green Lantern and his power ring to create the energy he used to rebuild Kamburu. J'onzz is able to enter Green Lantern's mind and reveal the truth of his imprisonment to him; soon thereafter, an enraged Guy Gardner breaks his bonds by seemingly overloading the energy containment center, inadvertently killing himself in the process. J'onzz also gives Destiny the information needed to reverse the American crop failure. His mission completed, J'onzz fades away.

The Justice League attacks Mongul a final time. Captain Thunder, Marksman, Midnight, and Widow are apparently killed in the attack. But Jor-El joins them and, eventually, is able to temporarily render Mongul unconscious. Jor-El flies Mongul into space in his ship and then blows the airlocks, killing Mongul (this Earth's version being apparently unable to survive in the vacuum of space); Jor-el's fate is unclear as the ship aimlessly drifts off.

See also
 List of Elseworlds publications